TransNamib Holdings Limited, commonly referred to as TransNamib, is a state-owned railway company in Namibia. Organised as a holding company, it provides both rail and road freight services, as well as passenger rail services. Its headquarters are in the country’s capital Windhoek.

History

A first local railway was constructed in 1895 by the Damaraland Guano Company for commercial purposes.  The first public railway, and the core of the present system, was constructed by the German colonial government. The 383 km connection between Swakopmund and Windhoek was inaugurated on June 19, 1902. The German colonial railway was taken over by the Railways of South Africa after World War I, and linked into the network of South Africa. After the independence of Namibia, TransNamib took control of the national rail network.

Operations

TransNamib operated 2,883 km of rail in 1995. Since then, further track has been added to the network through the Northern Extension. It operates on  Cape gauge. While focus has been primarily on freight services, passenger services are an important component of TransNamib and provided under the Starline logo. The “Desert Express” was a tourist train that ceased operations in 2020. 

In early 2011, the Karasburg - Ariamsvlei mainline was damaged by flash floods, as was part of the Seeheim-Lüderitz line; services were suspended.

Major lines and stations

Windhoek-Tsumeb/Walvis Bay
Windhoek Railway Station
Okahandja
Karibib
Swakopmund
Walvis Bay
Omaruru
Otjiwarongo
Tsumeb
Northern Extension:
Tsumeb
Ondangwa (completed 2006)
Oshikango (under construction, with future link to Angola)
Winhoek-Gobabis
Windhoek
Neudamm
Omitara
Gobabis
Windhoek-Upington
Windhoek
Rehoboth
Mariental
Maltahöhe
Gibeon
Asab
Tses
Keetmanshoop
Seeheim
Lüderitz
Karasburg
Upington, South Africa

See also

 Rail transport in Namibia
 Transport in Namibia
 South African Class 32-200
 South African Class 33-400
 Otavi Mining and Railway Company

References

External links
Official site
Desert Express
History

 
Railway companies of Namibia
Windhoek
3 ft 6 in gauge railways in Namibia